Robert Clinton James Skelton (born 11 March 1974) is an Australian politician. He has been the Labor Party State member for Nicklin in the Queensland Legislative Assembly since 2020.

Before his election, Skelton served for 10 years in the Australian Defence Force in the Royal Australian Navy and the Royal Australian Airforce. Afterwards, he worked as a firefighter rising to the rank of leading firefighter at Brisbane International Airport.

References

1974 births
Living people
Members of the Queensland Legislative Assembly
Australian Labor Party members of the Parliament of Queensland
21st-century Australian politicians
Labor Right politicians